Dillon is an unincorporated community in Tazewell County, in the U.S. state of Illinois.

History
Dillon was laid out in 1836, and named in honor of Nathan Dillon, a county official. The Dillon post office was discontinued in 1901.

References

Unincorporated communities in Tazewell County, Illinois
Unincorporated communities in Illinois